Kushmishera is a village development committee in the Baglung District in the Dhaulagiri Zone of central Nepal. At the time of the 1991 Nepal census it had a population of 2,944 and had 570 houses in the town.

References

Populated places in Baglung District